Jaywalking is a term commonly used in North America to refer to illegal or reckless pedestrian crossing of a roadway.

Jaywalking, Jaywalk, or Jaywalker may also refer to:

 Jaywalking (The Tonight Show): recurring segment on The Tonight Show with Jay Leno
 JWalk, unit testing toolkit for the Java programming language
 Jaywalk (horse) (born 2016), Thoroughbred racehorse
 The Jaywalker (animated short), see: Academy Award for Best Animated Short Film

Bands and Musicians
 The Jaywalks, Australian band
 J-Walk, Korean musical duo
 Dee Jaywalker, Belgian punk rock musician and songwriter

Albums
 Jaywalkin', 1975 album by jaxx bassist Niels-Henning Ørsted Pedersen
 Jaywalker (album), 2005 album by Josh Joplin
 The Jaywalker, 2004 album by Duke Ellington

See also
 Jay Walker (disambiguation)